Good Ol' Daze is the first full-length album by San Diego punk band Dogwood.

Track listing
 Grease 
 Label Me 
 Bored Games 
 As The World Burns 
 Good Ol' Daze 
 Keep In Touch 
 New School Hymn 
 Spotter Spoons 
 Social Security 
 Billy Mahoney's Baby 
 Doesn't This Remind You of Me 
 Lapchild 
 Chia Phunck 
 Liquid Lines 
 Simploid Creations 
 Unconditioned 
 Tune in Tomorrow 
 Tiramisu

Dogwood (band) albums
1996 debut albums